Jamner is a town and taluka in Jalgaon district of Maharashtra state in India. It is part of the Khandesh region.

Politics 
Former Water resources minister of Maharashtra Girish Mahajan is resident of Jamner. He is MLA from Jamner since 1996.

Demographics

See also
Jamner Municipal Council
Deulgaon Gujari

References

Cities and towns in Jalgaon district
Talukas in Maharashtra